Mariaryeni Gutiérrez Soto (born 5 May 1989) is an inactive Venezuelan tennis player.

Born in Caracas, Gutiérrez played collegiate tennis in the United States for Lamar University from 2006 to 2010. A three-time All-Southland player, she was a member of Lamar's title winning team in 2008 and in her senior season was named Southland Player of the Year, after going undefeated in singles (21-0).

Gutiérrez competed for the Venezuela Fed Cup team in both 2005 and 2015. She was a team silver medalist at the 2014 Central American and Caribbean Games and also represented Venezuela at the 2015 Pan American Games.

ITF finals

Doubles: 2 (0–2)

References

External links
 
 
 

1989 births
Living people
Venezuelan female tennis players
Lamar Cardinals and Lady Cardinals athletes
College women's tennis players in the United States
Tennis players from Caracas
Competitors at the 2014 Central American and Caribbean Games
Central American and Caribbean Games silver medalists for Venezuela
Central American and Caribbean Games medalists in tennis
Tennis players at the 2015 Pan American Games
Pan American Games competitors for Venezuela
20th-century Venezuelan women
21st-century Venezuelan women